New Caledonia elects a legislature. The Territorial Congress (Congrès Territorial) has 54 members, being the members of the three regional councils, all elected for a five-year term by proportional representation. 
New Caledonia has a multi-party system, with multiple strong parties.

Latest election

See also
Electoral calendar
Electoral system